Heliactinidia is a genus of moths in the subfamily Arctiinae. The genus was erected by George Hampson in 1901.

Selected species
Heliactinidia austriaca Seitz, 1919 Ecuador
Heliactinidia caerulescens Hampson, 1901 Colombia
Heliactinidia chiguinda (Druce, 1885) Colombia, Ecuador, Peru
Heliactinidia dispar (Warren, 1907) Argentina
Heliactinidia flavivena Dognin, 1909 Colombia
Heliactinidia hodeva (Druce, 1906) Peru
Heliactinidia nigrilinea (Walker, 1856) Espírito Santo in Brazil
Heliactinidia sitia Schaus, 1910 Costa Rica
Heliactinidia tornensis Prout, 1918 Colombia
Heliactinidia vespertilio (Dognin, 1911) Colombia

References

Arctiinae